Berith may refer to:

Covenants in Hebrew, particularly
 The biblical covenant between God and Israel
 Berith mila, the ceremony of circumcision
Baal Berith, a Canaanite deity